Associazione Sportiva Dilettantistica Riccione 1929 is an Italian football club located in Riccione, Emilia-Romagna. It currently plays in Serie D.

History

Valleverde Riccione FC 
Riccione was founded in 1929 as Valleverde Riccione Football Club. In summer 2010 his sports title of Serie D was transferred to Real Rimini, after the Batani family left the club because of management problems with the president Paolo Croatti.

ASD Riccione 1929 
The club was immediately refounded as Associazione sportiva dilettantistica Riccione 1929, acquiring the sports title of Eccellenza Emilia-Romagna club Associazione Sportiva Dilettantistica Del Conca, based in Morciano di Romagna.

The new team is the legitimate heir of the former Valleverde Riccione, finally having a company composed of people of Riccione.

In the 2010–11 season Riccione has won group B of Eccellenza Emilia-Romagna and has returned in Serie D.

Colors and badge 
Its colors are white and blue.

References

External links
 Official website

Football clubs in Italy
Football clubs in Emilia-Romagna
Association football clubs established in 1929
Serie C clubs
1929 establishments in Italy